L.E. Tonglet is an NHRA Mello Yello Drag Racing Pro Stock Motorcycle racer.  In the 2010 season he won the Motorcycle season championship.

He also won the prestigious NHRA U.S. Nationals.

Tonglet is currently a firefighter.

References

Living people
American motorcycle racers
Motorcycle drag racers
Year of birth missing (living people)